Glee: The Music, Volume 3 Showstoppers is a soundtrack album by the cast of the American television series Glee. The album contains songs from the second half of the show's first season, except for the episodes "The Power of Madonna" and "Journey to Regionals", songs from which feature on the extended plays Glee: The Music, The Power of Madonna and Glee: The Music, Journey to Regionals respectively. The album was released on May 18, 2010. Two editions are available: a standard edition containing 14 songs, and a deluxe edition, featuring 20 songs. Showstoppers debuted at No. 1 on the US Billboard 200, selling 136,000 copies in the first week. On November 21, 2010, it was announced that the album won Favorite Soundtrack of the Year at the American Music Awards.

Sales and chart performance
The album debuted at number one on the American, Australian, Canadian, and Irish charts. It sold 136,000 copies in its first and 63,000 in its second week of release in the US, and saw the Glee cast beat the record previously set by The Beatles in 1966, for shortest span between first weeks at number one, just four weeks after they reached number one with the extended play Glee: The Music, The Power of Madonna. In Canada, 14,000 copies were sold in the first week of release, and 9,400 in the second. The album has been certified platinum in Australia and Ireland, and gold in the United States.

Each of the songs included on the album were released as singles, available for digital download. The best-performing were "Gives You Hell", charting at the top position in Ireland, "Total Eclipse of the Heart", which charted at number 9 in the United Kingdom and number 16 in the US, and "Jessie's Girl" at number eight in Australia and number ten in Canada. 134,000 copies of "Total Eclipse of the Heart" were purchased in the US in its first week of release, making it the series' second best sales week ever to that point, with only the début single "Don't Stop Believin' registering bigger sales in its first week. "Jessie's Girl" has been certified gold in Australia, the first single to have reached this certification since "Don't Stop Believin. Comparing the singles' chart positions with prior charted versions, Billboard noted that by reaching number 26, the Glee cast version of "Dream On" surpassed the original Aerosmith version, which peaked at number 59 in 1973 (but was re-released in 1976 and reached number 6). The cast's cover of "Physical" saw Olivia Newton-John make her first Hot 100 appearance since her remake of "I Honestly Love You" reached number 99 in 1998.

Track listing

Standard edition
Unless otherwise indicated, Information is taken from Liner Notes

Deluxe edition
Unless otherwise indicated, Information is taken from Liner Notes

Notes
A  While track 5 (track 4 on the standard edition) is a mash-up of songs by The 5th Dimension (earlier recorded by Keely Smith) and Dionne Warwick (also recorded by Brook Benton and various other artists) respectively, the medley version was originally performed by Barbra Streisand on her 1971 album Barbra Joan Streisand.

Personnel

Vocals (main cast)
Dianna Agron
Kent Avenido
Chris Colfer
Jessalyn Gilsig
Jane Lynch
Jayma Mays (Credit only)
Kevin McHale
Lea Michele
Cory Monteith
Matthew Morrison
Amber Riley
Naya Rivera
Mark Salling
Stephen Tobolowsky
Jenna Ushkowitz

Guest vocals
Jonathan Groff
Olivia Newton-John
Kristin Chenoweth
Idina Menzel
Neil Patrick Harris

Additional Vocals
Adam Anders
Nikki Anders
Kala Balch
David Baloche
Colin Benward
Ravaughn Brown
Kamari Copeland
Tim Davis
Emily Gomez
Storm Lee
David Loucks
Chris Mann
Chaz Mason
Jeanette Olsen
Zac Poor
Jimmy Andrew Richard
Shelley Scarr
Drew Ryan Scott
Onitsha Shaw
Windy Wagner

Executive Producers
Dante Di Loreto
Brad Falchuk

Producers
Adam Anders
Peer Astrom
Ryan Murphy

Engineers
Adam Anders
Peer Astrom
Ryan Petersen

Soundtrack Producers
Adam Anders
Ryan Murphy

Art Direction, Design
Dave Bett
Maria Paula Marulanda

Coordination
Heather Guibert
Robin Koehler
Meaghan Lyons

Mastering
Dominick Maita

Mixing
Peer Astrom

Music Supervisor
PJ Bloom

Executive in Charge of Music
Geoff Bywater

Sources:

Charts and certifications

Weekly charts

Year-end charts

Certifications

Release history

References

Glee (TV series) albums
2010 soundtrack albums
Columbia Records soundtracks